The  is an Independent Administrative Institution under the supervision of the Ministry of Health, Labour and Welfare. It was established in 2003 with the integration of the Research Institution of Labour (日本労働研究機構) and the Institute of Labour Training (労働研修所). The institute is concerned with working conditions and safety for members of the Japanese work force.

References

External links
The Japan Institute of Labour Policy and Training

Institute of Labour
Occupational safety and health organizations
Safety organizations
Standards organizations in Japan